Olrik Fjord is a fjord in the Avannaata municipality, Northwestern Greenland. To the east the fjord opens into the Hvalsund, at the end of the Inglefield Gulf of the Baffin Bay.

This fjord was named by Robert Peary after Christian Søren Marcus Olrik,  Royal Inspector of North Greenland.

Geography
Olrik Fjord runs in a roughly east–west direction with its mouth west of Kangeq, in the southern shore of the mouth of the Inglefield Gulf, where the latter becomes the Hvalsund. It is a long and narrow fjord, having a shape uncommon in NW Greenland.

The Marie Glacier, an offshoot of the Leidy Glacier, discharges at the head of the Olrik Fjord, not far from the head of the Academy Fjord.

Bibliography
Daniel D. Roby, Henning Thing and Karen L. Brink, History, Status, and Taxonomic Identity of Caribou (Rangifer tarandus) in Northwest Greenland. Arctic Vol. 37, No. 1 (Mar., 1984), pp. 23-30
Geology of Greenland Survey Bulletin 174, 1997, p. 120 - GEUS

See also
List of fjords of Greenland
Arctic desert

References

External links
Arctic desert, Olrik Fjord, Northern Greenland
Some examples of dated musk-ox Ovibos moschatus finds from the Olrik Fjord area in the Thule region

Fjords of Greenland